The 2014 Wagner Seahawks football team represented Wagner College in the 2014 NCAA Division I FCS football season as a member of the Northeast Conference (NEC). They were led by 34th-year head coach Walt Hameline and played their home games at Wagner College Stadium. Wagner finished the season 7–4 overall and 5–1 in NEC play to share the conference championship with Sacred Heart. Despite the share of the conference title, they did not receive the NEC's automatic bid to the FCS Playoffs and did not receive an at-large bid.

On November 24, Hamline retired. He finished at Wagner with a 34-year record of 223–139–2.

Schedule

References

Wagner
Wagner Seahawks football seasons
Northeast Conference football champion seasons
Wagner Seahawks football